Castelmagno (Vivaro-Alpine: Chastèlmanh) is a small comune (municipality) in the Province of Cuneo in the Italian region of Piedmont, located about  southwest of Turin and about  west of Cuneo.

The population of the municipality of Castelmagno is divided between the frazioni (hamlets) of Einaudi, Campomolino, Colletto, Nerone, Chiotti and Chiappi; "Castelmagno" is the name of the municipal entity, not corresponding to any hamlet.

Castelmagno borders the following municipalities: Celle di Macra, Demonte, Dronero, Marmora, Monterosso Grana, Pradleves, and San Damiano Macra.

Demographic evolution

Twin towns — sister cities
Castelmagno is twinned with:

  Quittengo, Italy (1975)

References

Cities and towns in Piedmont